Dervish Ahmed ("Ahmed the Dervish; 1400–1484), better known by his pen name Âşıki or family name Aşıkpaşazade, was an Ottoman historian, a prominent representative of the early Ottoman historiography. He was a descendant (the great-grandson) of mystic poet dervish Aşık Pasha (1272–1333). He was born in the region of Amasya and studied in various Anatolian towns before going to Hajj and stayed some time in Egypt. He later took part in various Ottoman campaigns, such as the Battle of Kosovo (1448), Fall of Constantinople and witnessed the circumcision festivities of Mustafa and Bayezid II the sons of Mehmed the Conqueror. Later in his life he started to write his famous history work Tevārīḫ-i Āl-i ʿOsmān.

Works
His main works are known under two names: Menâkıb-ı Âli-i Osman and Tevārīḫ-i Āl-i ʿOsmān. The works deals with Ottoman history from the beginning of the Ottoman state until the time of Mehmed II. It is a chronological history of the Ottoman Empire between the years 1298 and 1472. The work is written in Ottoman Turkish and is partially based on older Ottoman sources, it is more detailed at the events he witnessed personally. His work was used by later Ottoman historians and became a fashion.

Criticism 
According to Halil Inalcik, in his works Aşıkpaşazade twisted his interpretation of the actual events to match his preconceptions. It was typical for him to simply merge two different stories to forge a new description of the battle. Some parts of "Cosmorama" or "Cihan-Nümâ", written by Neşri who was another prominent representative of early Ottoman Historiography, were based on the work of Aşıkpaşazade.

References

Bibliography
 Aşıkpaşazade: Vom Hirtenzelt zur hohen Pforte; Frühzeit und Aufstieg des Osmanenreiches nach der Chronik "Denkwürdigkeiten und Zeitläufte des Hauses ʻOsman" vom Derwisch Ahmed, genannt ʻAsik-Paşa-Sohn. Trans. Richard F. Kreutel. Graz: Styria, 1959.
 Franz Babinger. Die Geschichtsschreiber der Osmanen und ihre Werke. Leipzig 1927, p. 35–38.
 Cemal Kafadar. Between Two Worlds: The Construction of the Ottoman State. Berkeley, 1995.

Further reading 
 Halil Inalcik, "How to Read 'Ashik Pasha-zade's History", in Essays in Ottoman History (Istanbul: Eren, 1998) pp. 139–156

1400 births
1484 deaths
15th-century historians from the Ottoman Empire